Television in Kyrgyzstan was introduced in 1958, when Kyrgyzstan was still known as the Kirghiz SSR. KTR launched that year and broadcast in Russian language.

List of channels 
This is a list of television channels that broadcast in Kyrgyzstan.

State-owned

Private 

Regional

See also
 Television in the Soviet Union
 Media of Kyrgyzstan

References

External links
KTR Official site

 
Communications in Kyrgyzstan
Mass media in Kyrgyzstan